SC-20 may refer to:

SC-20, a DEC PDP-10-compatible computer developed by Systems Concepts
, a United States Navy submarine chaser commissioned in 1917 and transferred to the United States Department of War in 1920